Marcone Cena Cerqueira (born September 12, 1987 in Itabuna), known as Marcone, is a Brazilian footballer who plays for Doze as midfielder.

Career
Marcone began playing football with Esporte Clube Bahia. He was promoted to Bahia's senior squad in 2006, and made over 200 competitive appearances for the club.

Career statistics

References

External links

1987 births
Living people
Brazilian footballers
Association football midfielders
Campeonato Brasileiro Série A players
Campeonato Brasileiro Série B players
Campeonato Brasileiro Série C players
Esporte Clube Bahia players
Associação Desportiva São Caetano players
Atlético Clube Goianiense players
Comercial Futebol Clube (Ribeirão Preto) players
Clube Náutico Capibaribe players
Associação Desportiva Recreativa e Cultural Icasa players
Galícia Esporte Clube players